Zhang Sengyou (Chinese: , Zhāng Sēngyóu) was a famous Liang dynasty painter in the ink style in the reign of Emperor Wu of Liang.

His birth and death years are unknown, but he was active circa 490–540. He was from Wu Commandery (around present-day Suzhou, Jiangsu).

Background and reputation 
Zhang was a member of Zhang clan of Wu, one of the four prominent clans in Wu Commandery.

According to Tang dynasty art critic Zhang Yanyuan's "Notes of Past Famous Paintings", Zhang served as an official during the reign of Emperor Wu of Liang. He was the director of the imperial library and was also in charge of any painting related affairs in the court of Emperor Wu. Later, Zhang served the country as the general of right flank army and the governor of Wuxing Commandery. His works were rated the finest quality by Zhang Yanyuan. He also listed Zhang's artistic style as one of the four "Standards" of the traditional Chinese paintings; the other three artists were Gu Kaizhi, Lu Tanwei and Wu Daozi.

Yao Zui, an art critic in Chen Dynasty, described Zhang as a diligent painter who paints "without the notion of day and night".

Zhang was especially skillful in depicting human or animal figures. According to the History of the Southern Dynasties, Zhang painted a portrait for Prince Wuling, one of the sons of Emperor Wu of Liang. After viewing his son's portrait, the Emperor was amazed by the verisimilitude of Zhang's painting.

Buddhism with all its iconography, came to China from India, bringing with it to China a Western influence at one remove. Pictorial forms thus acquired a certain three-dimensional quality. Zhang Sengyou, working in the early sixth century, painted large murals of Buddhist shrines in Nanjing. He was one of the first to use these influences with happy results. He was also well known for landscapes, especially snow scenery, with a reputation for the so-called "boneless" technique (mogu).

Zhang is also associated with a famous story. It is said that one day, having painted four dragons on the walls of Anle temple in Jinling, he did not mark the pupil, not by negligence but prudence. However, one person, unwilling to heed Zhang's warnings, painted in the eyes of two dragons, causing the dragons to immediately flee to heaven riding on clouds with crashing thunder. Marking the eyes of dragons opens their eyes and gives them life. The spirit is fleeting, omnipresent, so that grasping and fixing it in a painting gives his work an uncanny power of suggestion. This story, summarized in the chengyu, is used in modern Chinese as a metaphor to describe a written work or speech that lacks only a small element which would make it perfect.

References

External links
 "Bring the Painted Dragons to Life  by Putting Pupils in Their Eyes" 

Liang dynasty painters
Painters from Suzhou
Liang dynasty politicians
Politicians from Suzhou
Buddhist artists